Hauteville may refer to:

Places in France

 Hauteville, a former commune in the Ain département, part of Hauteville-Lompnes
Hauteville, Aisne, in the Aisne département 
Hauteville, Ardennes, in the Ardennes département
Hauteville, Marne, in the Marne département 
Hauteville, Pas-de-Calais, in the Pas-de-Calais département
Hauteville, Savoie, in the Savoie département
Hauteville-la-Guichard, in the Manche département 
Hauteville-lès-Dijon, in the Côte-d'Or département
Hauteville-Lompnes, in the Ain département 
Hauteville-sur-Fier, in the Haute-Savoie département
Hauteville-sur-Mer, in the Manche département

Other

Hauteville, Switzerland, a municipality in the Canton of Fribourg, Switzerland
Hauteville family, a baronial family of Normandy

See also
 Hautteville-Bocage, in the Manche département
 Altavilla (disambiguation)